Diego Mainz García (born 29 December 1982) is a Spanish former footballer who played as a central defender.

He spent most of his 15-year professional career with Rayo Vallecano and Granada, appearing in 171 competitive matches with the latter club and totalling La Liga 129 games with both.

Club career

Rayo and Albacete
Born in Madrid, Mainz started his career at local Rayo Vallecano, going on to collect 36 appearances in La Liga (18 apiece from 2001 to 2003), his first being on 27 October as he played the full 90 minutes in a 2–1 home win against Deportivo de La Coruña. 

In summer 2007, as the capital side had slumped to the Segunda División B, he joined Albacete Balompié in the Segunda División.

Granada
After two seasons as first choice, Mainz was bought by Italy's Udinese Calcio, but was immediately transferred back to Spain with lowly Granada CF – eight other players made the same season-long move, after the two clubs' partnership agreement. With the Andalusians, he quickly established himself as an important player, helping to consecutive promotions in his first two seasons.

Mainz, who acted as captain when available, scored his first goal in the top flight on 20 March 2012, but in a 5–3 away loss to FC Barcelona. He finished the campaign with 21 appearances in 1,780 minutes, to help his team to retain their league status.

During 2014–15, Mainz netted three times in his own net. He added a further three in the other end, however, and the Nazaríes again managed to stay afloat; additionally, in a misty night on 17 December 2014, he scored at Córdoba CF to help the visitors to a 1–1 draw in the Copa del Rey and the subsequent 2–1 aggregate qualification.

International career
Mainz played once with the Spain under-21 team, featuring the second half of the 3–0 friendly win over Slovenia in Ourense.

References

External links

1982 births
Living people
Spanish footballers
Footballers from Madrid
Association football defenders
La Liga players
Segunda División players
Segunda División B players
Rayo Vallecano players
Albacete Balompié players
Granada CF footballers
Udinese Calcio players
Spain under-21 international footballers